René Dybkær (7 February 1926 – 29 April 2019) was a Danish scientist and fencer. He competed at the 1948 and 1952 Summer Olympics. He was most known for his activities about introducing the SI units in clinical laboratories.

References

External links
 

1926 births
2019 deaths
Danish male épée fencers
Olympic fencers of Denmark
Fencers at the 1948 Summer Olympics
Fencers at the 1952 Summer Olympics
Sportspeople from Copenhagen